Rain on Me may refer to:
"Rain on Me" (Ashanti song)
"Rain on Me" (Lady Gaga and Ariana Grande song)
"Rain on Me", a song by Atban Klann from Grass Roots
"Rain on Me", a song by Beth from My Own Way Home
"Rain on Me", a song by Byron Cage from An Invitation to Worship
"Rain on Me", a song by Cheryl Cole from 3 Words
"Rain on Me", a song by Corey Hart from Bang!
"Rain on Me", a song by Cyndi Lauper from Bring Ya to the Brink
"Rain on Me", a song by The Dawn from Beyond the Bend
"Rain on Me", a song by Electrafixion from Burned
"Rain on Me", a song by Gina Green
"Rain on Me", a song by Glenn Hughes from The Way It Is
"Rain on Me", a song by Jane Wiedlin from Tangled
"Rain on Me", a song by Joji
"Rain on Me", a song by Poster Children from Flower Plower
"Rain on Me", a song by Takayoshi Ohmura from Emotions in Motion
"Rain on Me", a song by Tamia from Tamia
"Blood to Water (Rain on Me)", a song by Swallow

See also
"Why Does It Always Rain on Me?", a song by Travis
"Raining on Me", a song by Gretchen Wilson from All Jacked Up
"Rain Over Me", a song by Pitbull featuring Marc Anthony
Love, Reign o'er Me, a song by The Who